The Artists Music Guild was a dba company of the International Academy of Music Arts and Sciences, Inc., until April 2014 when it incorporated into a non-profit corporation. The company opened its doors on January 1, 2010. The corporation is an entertainment and artists relation firm. Its primary goal is to mentor and protect artists from predatory industry practices.

History
The Guild began as a safe haven for artists who had been taken advantage of in the arts community. Its focus was to place several corporations and business leaders into a position of power within the Guild so that artists would not have to leave the protection of its umbrella. In April 2014 the Guild became an independent non-profit corporation and was no longer under the umbrella of its parent IAMAS Corporation. In May 2015, the Guild announced its partnership with the City of Monroe, North Carolina and the Monroe Crossing Mall to open offices into the mall. The Guild was charged with the duties of bringing in arts programs into the mall at various times of the year. The Guild also coordinated an art gallery inside of the mall which displays art work from artists throughout the country and the City of Monroe. The first program presented by the Guild was a concert by country music star Terri Gibbs and the Union County Youth Ballet.

Leadership
The Guild has two working boards. The first board is the "Executive board of directors." These are the CEO's of the Guild and owners of various other corporations. Their function is to oversee and make corporate decisions that effect the growth of the Guild as well as its visibility and expansion. The second board is the "board of directors." It is this board that works closely with the artists and service providers to ensure the mission of the Guild is being met.

Executive board of directors
The leadership of the Guild starts with Christian recording star, David L Cook. Beginning his career at the age of five with his family The Cook Family Singers, Cook spent most of his time onstage as a child. Cook partnered with Chris Nowels the president of IHN Productions, Inc., in Midlothian, Texas. Nowels and Cook had worked on various projects together. Most notably the two won an Emmy Award in 2011 for their work on the documentary, "The Award Goes To: A Look Back at the Legends" Elddy Trevino, owner of Loco Sound, Inc., in Monroe, NC was added to the board and serves as a service provider and director of convention audio for the Guild's annual conventions. Forrest Ward, the CEO and president of US Success Centers in Dallas, Texas was added as an executive board member and serves as an artist educator and career builder. Jason Howell, an SQL supervisor at Microsoft was added to the executive board and serves as electronic media and marketing. Howell maintains the Guild's websites and builds artist member websites. Philip Irish, from Fort Lauderdale, Florida was added as legal adviser to the executive board. Irish is an attorney but does not represent the Guild in court actions. His role is simply to advise the Guild and to resolve disputes.

Board of directors
The Guild's board of directors work hands on with established artists while mentoring up and coming artists. They educate artists on industry pitfalls and how to protect themselves against predatory practices. Each board member must agree to be a mentor to maintain their board position.

Artistic board of directors
The Guild's Artistic board of directors work on voting and convention activities. This also includes the AMG Heritage Awards broadcast. Gayla Earlene served as the first Artistic Board Review Leader. The leaders main responsibility is to identify and chooses the twenty five anonymous final judges for the last stages of awards voting procedures. It is also their responsibility to certify and confirm all nominations before moving the ballots to the membership for final voting.

Mentoring
One of the Guild's primary focus' is on education. Members of the Guild must agree to be a mentor to achieve and maintain their Guild membership. Once a member, they are required to help in the education sector of the public school systems. Professional artists are asked to go into the classrooms to teach various skill sets such as vocal, stage presence, breathing or industry practices. The Guild works in tandem with school boards across the country to ensure teachers have continued curriculum that otherwise might be beyond their affordability. In 2012, Terry Webster was added to the Guild's board of directors as the "President of Education and Programming." Webster is responsible for setting up programs within the public school systems as well as during the Guild's convention and awards shows. Many professional artists lend their talents to the continuing curriculum to be taught in the classroom. Chubby Checker serves as the Guild's spokesperson and front man who makes public appearances into the classrooms in an effort to excite young people about the arts and a possible career opportunities. In an effort to ensure each school child has a proper start the Guild provides book bags and school supplies to all children attending their conventions and awards broadcast. They also provide schools with various instruments and equipment that the schools may need but do not have the financial means to procure.

Heritage Awards

The Guild created the Heritage Awards as an outlet to allow all forms of arts and entertainment to be recognized by their peers. The Heritage Awards are held every year on the second weekend in November and formerly took place at the historic Heritage USA. The 2014 awards broadcast was moved to Monroe, North Carolina, due to the loss of the Heritage USA Studio property by its former owners. The AMG Heritage Awards presents twenty-five awards to artists in various categories. Despite the term music in the company's title, it umbrellas all forms of artistic expression.

2011 Heritage convention
The 2011 convention was held on November 10, 2011. The members of the Guild participated in the filming of a documentary entitled, "The History of Music in the United States." It was a complete look and depiction of the origins of various forms of music and how they were pivotal to the growth of the music movement throughout the United States.

2012 Heritage awards
The 2012 convention and awards were held on November 8, 2012. The host for the evening was Christian comedian Trina Jeffrie.

2013 Heritage awards
The 2013 convention and awards were held on November 9, 2013, and hosted by music legend Chubby Checker.  Participants for the awards broadcast included, Lynn Anderson, Terri Gibbs, Betty Jean Robinson, Dino Kartsonakis, David L Cook and the Dixie Melody Boys.

The first official worldwide broadcast of the AMG Heritage Awards was aired on January 28, 2014, on The Dish Network to an audience of over 14 million homes.

2014 Heritage awards
The 2014 convention and awards were held on November 15, 2014, and hosted by country music star Billy Gilman and Mallory Lewis and Lamb Chop (puppet). The show was moved from its home in Fort Mill, SC to Monroe, NC and sponsored by the City of Monroe. Participants in the 2014 show included, Gloria Gaynor, Terri Gibbs, Dee Dee Sharp, Shirley Caesar. Christy Sutherland, David L Cook, David Meece and Chubby Checker. Other guests included YouTube stars Sam and Nia, Kat Williams and Dennis Reed and GAP which were finalists on America's Got Talent.

2015 Heritage awards
The 2015 convention and awards were held on November 14, 2015, and hosted by American Idol, Bucky Covington. The show took place at the AG Convention Center in Monroe, NC and was sponsored by the City of Monroe. Participants for the 2015 show include, Dee Dee Sharp, Martha Reeves and the Vandellas, Billy Paul, Melanie Safka, Melba Moore, Christy Sutherland, Kat Williams, David L Cook and Mike Manuel. NC Secretary of State, Elaine Marshall was also in attendance. The show aired in its entirety on February 20, 2015, on the Sky Angel Network.

2016 Heritage awards
The 2016 convention and awards were held November 12, 2016 and hosted by television star Clifton Davis and Freda Payne. The show took place at the AG Convention center in Monroe as in years past. Participants for the 2016 show include Evelyn Champagne King, Gene Chandler, The Orlons, Peggy March, Terri Gibbs, Dee Dee Sharp, David L Cook, David Meece, Mayor Jennifer Roberts (politician) and Christy Sutherland. The Heritage Awards are set to air on January 29, 2017, on the Sky Angel Network.

2017 Heritage Awards
The 2017 convention and awards were held November 11, 2017 and hosted by music dignitaries Marilyn McCoo and Billy Davis Jr. The show took place at its stationary AG Convention Center in Monroe. Participants for the show were The Coasters, The Tymes, Lloyd Price, David L. Cook, pianist, Jonathan Helms and Dee Dee Sharp. The show is to be aired February 11, 2018 on the Sky Angel Network.

References

External links
 
 IAMAS Corporation
 AMG Heritage Awards
 IHN Productions, Inc.
 Loco Sound
 Jason Howell

American companies established in 2004
Companies based in Charlotte, North Carolina
Companies based in Tennessee
2004 establishments in Tennessee
American television awards
Education companies established in 2004